SMS Luise was a steam corvette of the German Kaiserliche Marine (Imperial Navy). Ordered as part of a large naval expansion program after the Austro-Prussian War, she was laid down in 1871 during the Franco-Prussian War. She was launched in December 1872 and completed in June 1874. Luise was a small vessel, armed with a battery of just eight guns.

Luise went on two major overseas cruises early in her career, both to East Asian waters. The first lasted from 1875 and 1877; during the cruise, she visited Chinese ports to protect German interests and show the flag. The second lasted from 1878 to 1880 and saw similar activities, though during her time in the East Asia Squadron, she served as its flagship. While on the way home, she attempted to negotiate a dispute between Germany and Madagascar, but a severe storm forced her to leave before a settlement could be reached. 

In 1881, Luise was converted into a training ship, and she served in this capacity for most of the rest of her career. She made several overseas cruises, visiting the Americas twice in 1881–1882 and 1885. The ship carried replacement crews to the gunboats stationed in German West Africa in 1886 and 1887. Luise was hulked in 1892 and used as a torpedo test ship in 1894–1896, before being stricken from the naval register in December 1896. She was sold for scrap the following year and broken up in Hamburg.

Design

The three Ariadne-class corvettes were ordered as part of the fleet plan of 1867, an expansion program aimed at strengthening the Prussian Navy in the wake of the Austro-Prussian War. The plan called for a total of twenty screw corvettes. The design for Luise was prepared in 1869, but work on the ship was delayed until 1871 by the outbreak of the Franco-Prussian War.

She displaced  at full load. The ship's crew consisted of 12 officers and 220 enlisted men. As built, Luise was equipped with a full ship rig, but this was later reduced to a barque rig.

Luise was armed with a battery of six  22-caliber (cal.) breech-loading guns and two  23-cal. guns. In 1882, she had four  Hotchkiss revolver cannon installed.

Service history
The keel for Luise, named for Princess Louise of Prussia, was laid down in 1871 at the Kaiserliche Werft (Imperial Shipyard) in Danzig. She was launched on 16 December 1872 without any celebration and she was commissioned into the fleet on 4 June 1874. She then began sea trials, which ended in mid-July, after which she was moved to Wilhelmshaven and decommissioned in late August.

First deployment abroad

Luise was reactivated in early 1875 for training operations with the main fleet in German waters. She was ordered on a deployment abroad late in the year, which she began on 11 October. She left Wilhelmshaven on 26 October and sailed through the Atlantic Ocean to Rio de Janeiro, Brazil before rounding the Cape of Good Hope into the Indian Ocean. She arrived in Melbourne, Australia on 1 April 1876, where she was compelled to stay for two weeks, since a fever had broken out among the crew. From there, Luise sailed to Jolo, the main island of the Sulu Archipelago of the Philippines. In the capital of Jolo, she attempted to secure payment of a debt owed to a German merchant, but she was unable to do so, as the residents of the town had burned it to the ground and fled to the interior of the island during a revolt against the colonial Spanish government.

Luise met with the East Asia Squadron in Hong Kong on 1 July and she relieved her sister ship , which then began the voyage back to Germany. On 13 July, Luise sailed to Chefoo in company with the squadron flagship, the screw frigate , since the German ambassador feared there would be Chinese riots as a result of British activities in the area. By the end of September, the threat of unrest had passed, and so on 1 October, Luise was able to begin a tour of several Chinese ports. At the end of January 1877, Luise went to Shanghai to ensure that the Chinese authorities had dropped the tax on German imports in the port. She then steamed up the Yangtze to Wuhu to show the flag and conduct hydrographic surveys. Luise sailed to Nagasaki, Japan, after her work around Wuhu was completed. There, she underwent an overhaul; during this work, the British ironclad warship  accidentally collided with her, crushing three of her boats and wrecking one of the boat cranes. After repairs were completed, Luise received the order to return to Germany; she left Nagasaki on 7 May and arrived back in Wilhelmshaven on 1 September. At the beginning of 1878, she went into the shipyard to be modernized, which included a reduction of her sailing rig.

Second deployment abroad
Luise was reactivated in late 1878 for another foreign cruise, and she left Germany on 3 December. This time, she passed through the Suez Canal on her way to East Asian waters. While on the way from Aden to Bombay on 26 January 1879, she collected deep-ocean temperature and salinity samples in conjunction with scientific expeditions conducted by the German frigate  and the British corvette . Luise then stopped in Bombay and Calcutta, the first time the ports had been visited by a German warship. She proceeded on to Hong Kong, where she arrived in early May to replace her sister . Shortly thereafter, the corvette  reached Hong Kong; her captain, Kapitän zur See (Captain at Sea) Carl Paschen, had been the senior officer of the East Asia Squadron by date of rank, but he was replaced in this position by Luises commander.

Beginning in June 1879, Luise toured Japanese ports, sometimes in company with the corvette  and in August she conducted additional deep-see tests in the Korea Strait. The situation had calmed by 24 April, allowing Luise to return to Hong Kong, since she had received orders to return to Germany at the beginning of April. After making preparations for the voyage, she left Hong Kong on 3 July and sailed to Madagascar to complete a diplomatic mission on the way back to Germany.

Anti-European sentiment was strong among the island's population in the context of French colonial ambitions, and they refused to recognize the German ambassador. Luise stopped in the main port at Tamatave, where Luises captain and five officers met with Prime Minister Rainilaiarivony on 16 August. Negotiations were not possible with the government as a result of the approach of a very strong storm that forced Luise to leave the island immediately. She proceeded on to Simonstown to replenish her stock of coal before continuing on to Wilhelmshaven, where she arrived on 9 November and was decommissioned on 20 November.

Training ship

Luise was converted into a training ship for Schiffsjungen (apprentice seamen) in early 1881, and she entered service in this role on 15 April. From 18 May to the middle of June, she conducted a training cruise in the Baltic Sea, and on 19 June she began a voyage to North, Central, and South America. She visited a number of ports, including Halifax, Canada, and Georgetown, British Guiana. She arrived back in Kiel on 4 September 1882, where she joined the fleet training exercises that were being conducted in the Baltic. She was decommissioned for the year on 25 September.

The ship had deteriorated in condition by this time, so in 1883 she was taken into the Kaiserliche Werft in Danzig for a thorough repair. This work lasted until February 1885, and on the 24th she was recommissioned to resume her training duties. Luise conducted a short set of trials outside Kiel before cruising in the Baltic starting on 11 May. The ship began another overseas cruise on 1 June, again to the Americas. On the way back from the tour, she stopped in Queenstown, Ireland, and then went to Cowes to represent Germany at a Royal Navy fleet review in 1886. She left Cowes on 10 August and visited Gravesend and Leith before arriving in Wilhelmshaven on 10 September.

She sailed to Douala, Kamerun to transfer the new crews, and arrived back in Wilhelmshaven on 26 January 1887. She was then formally re-designated as a school ship. Luise moved to Kiel on 10 February, where her crew was reduced. On 5 April, she had her crew replenished to resume training duties. She was present during the celebration of the beginning of construction of the Kaiser Wilhelm Canal in Kiel. She went on further cruises in German waters until 9 September; six days later she was decommissioned and assigned to the I. Reserve.

A month later on 15 October, Luise was reactivated to carry another set of replacement crews to the gunboats in West Africa. She reached Douala on 17 December, transferred the crews, and left ten days later, arriving back in Kiel on 18 February 1888. Two days later, she was again decommissioned and placed in the I. Reserve, which lasted until April, when she was recommissioned for another stint as a training ship. She cruised in the Baltic until 29 September, when she returned to Kiel for an overhaul. She spent the years 1890 and 1891 as a training ship; she also participated in those years' fleet maneuvers. Luise was converted into a hulk in 1891 and based in Kiel, serving in that capacity until 19 December 1896, when she was stricken from the naval register. During this period, she was also used as a torpedo test ship from late 1894 to 16 April 1896. She was sold the following year and broken up in Hamburg.

Notes

References

Further reading
 

Ariadne-class corvettes
1872 ships
Ships built in Danzig